Surigao del Sur's at-large congressional district is a defunct congressional district that encompassed the entire province of Surigao del Sur in the Philippines. It was represented in the House of Representatives from 1961 to 1972 and in the Regular Batasang Pambansa from 1984 to 1986. The province of Surigao del Sur was created as a result of the partition of Surigao in 1960 and elected its first representative provincewide at-large during the 1961 Philippine House of Representatives elections. The district remained a single-member district until the dissolution of the lower house in 1972. It was later absorbed by the multi-member Region XI's at-large district for the national parliament in 1978. In 1984, provincial and city representations were restored and Surigao del Sur elected one member for the regular parliament. The district was abolished following the 1987 reapportionment to establish two districts in the province under a new constitution.

Representation history

See also
Legislative districts of Surigao del Sur

References

Former congressional districts of the Philippines
Politics of Surigao del Sur
1960 establishments in the Philippines
1972 disestablishments in the Philippines
1984 establishments in the Philippines
1986 disestablishments in the Philippines
At-large congressional districts of the Philippines
Congressional districts of Caraga
Constituencies established in 1960
Constituencies disestablished in 1972
Constituencies established in 1984
Constituencies disestablished in 1986